Robert Vogel may refer to:

 Robert Vogel (judge) (1918–2005), justice on the North Dakota Supreme Court
 Robert Vogel (marksman) (born 1981), American professional shooter and champion
 Bob Vogel (born 1941), American football player